Gregorio Fiallo (born 4 February 1952) is a Cuban former swimmer. He competed in three events at the 1968 Summer Olympics.

References

1952 births
Living people
Cuban male swimmers
Olympic swimmers of Cuba
Swimmers at the 1968 Summer Olympics
Sportspeople from Havana